Robbins is an unincorporated community in Ontonagon County in the U.S. state of Michigan.  The community is located within Haight Township.

History
A post office opened in Robbins in 1891, closed in 1898, reopened in 1902, and closed permanently in 1911. The community was named for F. S. Robbins, the owner of a local sawmill.

References

Unincorporated communities in Michigan
Unincorporated communities in Ontonagon County, Michigan